Shobdon Priory was a priory in Herefordshire, England at .

The church dated from 1140 and was demolished in the 18th century.

References

Monasteries in Herefordshire